Manurewa AFC is an amateur football (soccer) club in Manurewa, Auckland, New Zealand. They will compete in Lotto Sport Italia NRFL Division 1 with newly appointed head coach Marty Rodwell

History
Manurewa AFC was formed by the merger of Tramways (1929 Chatham Cup winner) and another club named Manurewa. The merged entity initially used the portmanteau name of Tramurewa, during which time the club won the 1931 Chatham Cup. Tramuwera reverted to the name of Manurewa in 1959, the name currently used by the club.

Manurewa competed in the New Zealand National Soccer League from 1979 to 1992, finishing as champions in 1983.

In 2008 Manurewa won the NRFL Division 1 with Brad Armstrong finishing top scorer in the league with 22 goals. Coach, Mark Armstrong, claimed the coach of the year award for the league.

Notable former players
The following players represented New Zealand while playing for Manurewa:
 Dave Bright
 Frank van Hattum
 Keith Mackay
 Sam Malcolmson
 Lee Stickland
 Steve Sumner
 Mark Armstrong

The following players represented New Zealand futsal while playing for Manurewa:
 Marvin Eakins
 Clay Chapel

References

External links
Official website
New Zealand 2004/05 Season Results
  

  

Association football clubs in Auckland
1929 establishments in New Zealand
Association football clubs in New Zealand